Luffenham may refer to the following places in England:

North Luffenham
South Luffenham
Luffenham railway station